Keith Fullerton Whitman (born May 29, 1973) is an American electronic musician who has recorded albums influenced by many genres, including ambient music, drill and bass, and krautrock. He records and performs using many aliases, of which the best-known is Hrvatski (the Croatian word for Croatian). His works under the Hrvatski moniker mainly fell under the 'drill and bass' subgenre of IDM, and were his main musical outlet in the mid-to-late 1990s. Other solo aliases include ASCIII and Anonymous. Keith was in many bands in the 1990s, including El-Ron, The Liver Sadness, Sheket/Trabant, The Finger Lakes and Gai/Jin.

Fullerton Whitman started recording using his own name in 2001, and most of his work recorded today is under that name. His brother, former MIT scientist Brian Alexander Whitman and co-founder of The Echo Nest, is also an electronic musician and sound artist performing under name Blitter.

Electronic music career
Whitman studied computer music at Berklee College of Music, where he was exposed to modern electronic music composition and synthesis. Whitman says that before this he was initially drawn to making music by listening to the radio in the New York city suburbs in the 1980s. His moniker ASCIII has released music distributed with an academic journal. His studio and live setup usually consists of a PowerBook running Max/MSP or Logic Pro, and other analogue instruments, such as guitars, ouds and synthesizers.

Whitman has released albums on labels such as Planet Mu, Kranky, Carpark Records as well on his own Entschuldigen and (now defunct) Reckankreuzungsklankewerkzeuge labels.

In 2013, Whitman released Greatest Hits on SoundCloud: a 12-hour-long audio project developed from samples of pop songs from Whitman's youth. Sample are snipped out, slowed to half speed and then run through Whitman's signature array of boxes and generators to create an "automatic enhancement" of the original tune.

Whitman currently runs Mimaroglu Music Sales which offers distribution of an extensive collection of avant-garde music.

Discography

As Hrvatski
 Okapi Tracks (mp3.com, 1999)
 Oiseaux 96-98 (Reckankreuzungsklankewerkzeuge, 1999)
 Swarm & Dither (Planet Mu, 2002)
 Untitled 7" (Planet Mu, 2002)
 Irrevocably Overdriven Break Freakout Megamix (Entschuldigen, 2005)

As Keith Fullerton Whitman
21:30 for Acoustic Guitar... CD (Apartment B, 2001)
Playthroughs CD (Kranky, 2002)
Dartmouth Street Underpass CD (Locust Music, 2003)
Antithesis LP (Kranky, 2004)
Schöner Flußengel LP (Kranky, 2004)
Multiples CD (Kranky, 2005)
Twenty Two Minutes for Electric Guitar CD (Entschuldigen, 2005)
Yearlong CD (with Greg Davis) (Carpark, 2005)
Lisbon CD (Live Oct. 4 2005 in Lisbon) (Kranky 2006)
Taking Away Cass. (Digitalis Ltd. 2009)
Dream House Variations 4xCass. (Arbor 2009)
Disingenuity B/W Disingenuousness LP, (Pan 2010)
Generator Cass. (Root Strata 2011)
Generators LP (Editions Mego 2012)
Occlusions LP (Editions Mego 2012)
Live Occlusions (1) Cass, (Protracted View 2013)
Live Occlusions (2) Cass, (Protracted View 2013)

Compilation appearances
"20041203.Wfmu" on Brainwaves (2006)

References

External links 

Allmusic entry for Keith Fullerton Whitman
Allmusic entry for Hrvatski

Living people
1973 births
American electronic musicians
Berklee College of Music alumni
Carpark Records artists
Planet Mu artists
Locust Music artists